WHGE-LP (95.3 FM) is a radio station licensed to serve the community of Wilmington, Delaware. The station is owned by the Afro-American Historical Society of Delaware. It airs a community radio format, focusing on Black cultural education.

The station was assigned the WHGE-LP call letters by the Federal Communications Commission on July 20, 2015.

References

External links
 Official Website
 

HGE-LP
HGE-LP
Radio stations established in 2018
2018 establishments in the United States
Community radio stations in the United States
New Castle County, Delaware